Steven Matteo (born February 18, 1977) is an American politician who served as Council member for the 50th district of the New York City Council. He is a Republican.

His district is located completely on Staten Island and encompasses the neighborhoods of Arrochar, Bloomfield, Bulls Head, Castleton Corners, Chelsea, Concord, Dongan Hills, Egbertville, Emerson Hill, Fort Wadsworth, Graniteville, Grant City, Grasmere, Heartland Village, Isle of Meadows, Lighthouse Hill, Manor Heights, Meiers Corners, Midland Beach, New Dorp, New Springville, Oakwood, Ocean Breeze, Old Town, Prall's Island, Richmondtown, Rosebank, Shore Acres, South Beach, Todt Hill, Travis, Westerleigh, and Willowbrook.

Life and career
Born on Staten Island as the youngest of three sons, Steven Matteo earned a B.A. from St. Francis College and a J.D. from Touro Law School. He started in politics by working as Deputy Director of Constituent Services to then-Councilman James Oddo in 2004 and then as Chief of Staff in 2006.

Matteo was originally going to be a candidate for the 50th Council district in 2009 but withdrew after the change in the term limits law permitted Oddo to seek a third full term.

New York City Council
Matteo contested a bitter Republican primary for the seat on September 10, 2013, against attorney Lisa Giovinazzo. The party feud led to fissures between Minority Leader James Oddo and Congressman Michael Grimm; the latter was supporting Giovinazzo. The disagreement over the party's nomination in this race led to the resignation of GOP County Chairman and Grimm ally, Robert Scamardella. Ultimately, Matteo won with 55% of the vote.

In the general election, John Mancuso was the nominee of the Democratic Party. Matteo won the general with nearly 64% of the vote. In 2017, he won re-election with almost 80% of the vote.

Steven Matteo took office in 2014 and has had a focus on small business initiatives including the creation of merchant groups in his district. Additionally, he has made traffic flow and driver safety a priority through intersection improvement requests. In 2018 Matteo was appointed to serve at the Chair of the City Council's Committee on Standards and Ethics.

Due to the news of an impending resignation from the Council by Vincent Ignizio, there was speculation as to whether Matteo or Queens Republican Eric Ulrich would succeed to the position of Minority Leader. Matteo was ultimately elected with votes from himself and Ignizio before the latter's departure from the Council.

To date, Matteo has authored 22 pieces of legislation to pass the New York City Council. Among his first was a bill that improved building construction standards by requiring mold resistant materials in moisture prone locations of new buildings. This was followed later in 2014 with a local law creating the  West Shore Industrial Business Improvement District. In 2016, Matteo authored and passed legislation that would require the City of New York to provide free automated external defibrillators for any youth baseball league that has games and practices on City-owned fields.

Electoral history

References

External links
NYC Council: District 50 - James S. Oddo

|-

1977 births
American people of Italian descent
Candidates in the 2021 United States elections
St. Francis College alumni
Living people
New York City Council members
New York (state) Republicans
21st-century American politicians
Politicians from Staten Island